The Palace also known as Palace: Lock Sinensis is a 2013 Chinese historical romance film. This film was directed by Pan Anzi and written by Yu Zheng, and starring Zhou Dongyu, Chen Xiao and Zhao Liying.

Plot 
During the reign of the Kangxi Emperor, Yaojia Chenxiang entered the Forbidden Palace as a lowly servant. Chenxiang learned the ways of surviving in the palace and became close friends with another servant named Liuli and Chunshou, a eunuch. She also meets Yinxiang, a prince raised by Consort De and is friends with the fourth prince Yinzhen. They meet by chance, but she never reveals her identity to him. He later searches for this mystery girl and Liuli claims that she was the mystery girl.

Liuli betrays Chenxiang to become the di fujin (official wife) of Yinxiang. Chenxiang is heartbroken but becomes Liuli's servant in order to protect Chunshou, who was tortured by Liuli. As Liuli's servant, Chenxiang is humiliated and forced to only look at Yinxiang from a distance. One night, she enters Liuli's bedchamber only to find out that she carries an affair with Yuntang, another prince. Liuli is mad at Chenxiang, and increases her punishments. Yinxiang grows suspicious of Liuli, and asks her who the mystery girl really was. Liuli refused to tell him, and ran away from the palace only to be shot with arrows. Yinxiang, now blind, eventually reunites with Chenxiang.

Cast

Main cast
 Zhou Dongyu as Chenxiang
 Zhang Zifeng as Chenxiang, young.
 Chen Xiao as Yinxiang
 Fangyao Ziyi as Yinxiang, young.
 Zhao Liying as Liuli
 Jiang Yiyi as Liuli, young.

Other cast
 Lu Yi as Yongzheng Emperor.
 Zhu Zixiao as Yuntang.
 Winston Chao as Kangxi Emperor.
 Vivian Wu as Empress Xiaogongren.
 Bao Bei'er as Chunshou
 Wang Shuang as Concubine Cheng

Guest
 Jess Zhang as Concubine Xuan.
 Annie Yi as Empress Xiaojingxian.
 Eva Huang as Concubine Min.
 Zhang Yameng as Concubine Hui.
 Lam Chi-chung as Yunreng.
 Kingdom Yuen as Mammy.
 Dicky Cheung as The eunuch.
 Bai Shan as Qiuniang.

Release
The film had its premiere at the 16th Shanghai International Film Festival.

Box office
The film grossed ￥21 million by the end of its first day of general release and grossed ￥ 48 million on its first weekend.

Critical response
The film received negative reviews. It was listed on Sohu's 2013 Top Ten Bad Film.

References

External links

2013 films
Films set in the 17th century
Chinese historical romance films
2010s historical romance films
Films directed by Pan Anzi
Works by Yu Zheng
2010s Mandarin-language films